The 2022 season was the 15th season for the Indian Premier League franchise Mumbai Indians. They were one of the ten teams to compete in the league.

Background
The franchise retained four players ahead of the 2022 mega-auction.

Retained
Rohit Sharma
Suryakumar Yadav
Jasprit Bumrah
Kieron Pollard

Released
Aditya Tare
Anmolpreet Singh
Anukul Roy
Dhawal Kulkarni
Hardik Pandya
Ishan Kishan
Jayant Yadav
Krunal Pandya
Quinton de Kock
Rahul Chahar
Trent Boult
Chris Lynn
Saurabh Tiwary
Mohsin Khan
Piyush Chawla
James Neesham
Marco Jansen
Yudhvir Charak
Nathan Coulter-Nile
Adam Milne
Arjun Tendulkar

Squad 
 Players with international caps are listed in bold.
Squad strength: 24 (16 - Indian, 8 - overseas)

Administration and support staff

Kit manufacturers and sponsors

|

Teams and standings

Points table

Group fixtures

Statistics

Most runs

Most wickets

References

External links
Official Website

Cricket teams in India
2022 Indian Premier League
Mumbai Indians seasons